Pathapee Leh Ruk is a 2010 Thai lakorn 1 in a 4 drama series called 4 Hearts of the Mountains or 4 Huajai Haeng Koon Kao (4 หัวใจแห่งขุนเขา ) that it's aired on Channel 3. It starred Prin Suparat and Chalida Vijitvongthong.

Synopsis
Pathapee "Din" Adisuan (Prin Suparat) is the owner of Thararin Resort and has to confront the troublemaker that goes into his resort and that included Cha-Aim (Chalida Vijitvongthong) daughter of Mok (Jakkrit Ammarat) the owner of Maek Mai Valley and one of the enemy of Thararin Resort who plans to destroy Thararin's reputation in order to be accepted by his father and also the fact that she believes that Pathapee had hurt her parents before so she wanted to destroy Thararin Resort, but as they quarrel and conspire each other's back and in the end they find that they have an ever growing attraction for each other, but which one is more important family, resort or their love?.

Cast

Main cast
 Prin Suparat (Mark) as Pathapee "Din" Adisuan 
 Chalida Vijitvongthong (Mint) as Cher-Aim (Cha-Aim) Vongvanitsakunkit/Cher-Aim (Cha-Aim) Vongvai
 Jessica Pasaphan (Jessie) as RungArun "Oliang" Yenjai
 Jakkrit Ammarat (Kik) as Natee
 Nadech Kugimiya (Barry) as Akkanee "Fai" Adisuan
 Pakorn Chatborirak (Boy) as Wayupak "Lom" Adisuan

Supporting Cast
 Jakkrit Ammarat (Ton) as Mok
 Panchanida Seesaamram (Pang) as Sonchat "Pine"
 Natthaphong Karbthong as Tonsai
 Boromwuti Hiranyathiti (Mick) as Saroj
 Tanongsak Supakarn as Wasan
 Supranee Jayrinpon as Mali
 Yuwadee Praihirun as Khun Bualoy
 Nilubon Amornvitavat as Khun Rarin

Special appearances
 Kimberly Ann Voltemas (Kim) as Thipthara "Nam Adisuan-Rajaput

Awards

References

Thai television soap operas
2010s Thai television series
2010 Thai television series debuts
2010 Thai television series endings
Channel 3 (Thailand) original programming